Ivett is a given name of Hungarian origin that is the equivalent of the French Yvette.

People 
 Ivett Gonda (born 1986), Canadian taekwondoer

Hungarian feminine given names